Bistrica is a settlement in the Municipality of Šentrupert in southeastern Slovenia. The municipality is now included in the Southeast Slovenia Statistical Region. The settlement lies on the regional road leading southeast from Mirna to Mokronog in the historical region of Lower Carniola. The rail line from Sevnica to Trebnje runs south of the settlement.

Name
Bistrica was attested in written sources as Fewstritz in 1404, among other spellings.

Landmarks
At the southeastern edge of the village stands Simončič Hayrack, the only hayrack in Slovenia with the status of a cultural monument of national significance. It is used as a venue for art exhibitions and other cultural events as well as to dry hay and store agricultural machinery. Another significant object in the village is a three-arch stone road bridge over the Bistrica River, built in the first half of the 19th century.

References

External links

Bistrica at Geopedia

Populated places in the Municipality of Šentrupert